The Tolly Cobbold Classic was a non-ranking snooker tournament staged between 1979 and 1984. It was held at the Corn Exchange in Ipswich and sponsored by local brewers Tolly Cobbold. It is not to be confused with the Classic ranking event.

History 

Tolly Cobbold began a four-man tournament in Corn Exchange, Ipswich in 1978, and with television coverage of Anglia TV the Tolly Cobbold Classic began in 1979 at the same location.

The event used three different formats during its history. In 1979 and 1981 there were two groups of four, with the winner of the groups advancing to the final. In 1980 only four players participated in a round-robin group, with the top 2 players advancing to the final. Between 1982 and 1984 the tournament was converted to a knock-out format with eight players. After the 1984 event Tolly Cobbold decided to sponsor the English Professional Championship instead, and the event was abandoned.

Winners

References

 
Snooker non-ranking competitions
Snooker competitions in England
Recurring sporting events established in 1979
Recurring events disestablished in 1984
1979 establishments in England
1994 disestablishments in England
Sport in Ipswich
Defunct snooker competitions
Defunct sports competitions in England